St. Paul's is a former church building of the Catholic Church sited on Arran Quay, Dublin, Ireland. The church is used currently by a Catholic youth group and by the St. Gregrorios Jacobite Syrian Christian Church.

History
The church was built between 1835 and 1837 to the design of Patrick Byrne who also designed nearby St Audoen's Catholic Church and the Church of the Immaculate Conception (Adam and Eve's) on Merchants Quay. Eamonn and Sinead De Valera were married at St. Paul's in 1910 and in 1852 Captain Charles Boycott married Annie Dunne. It is currently (2017) closed to the public after a decline in numbers living in the parish. The church is used currently by a Catholic youth group and by the St. Gregrorios Jacobite Syrian Christian Church.

Architecture
St Paul's was Byrne's first church. The cornerstone was laid on St Patrick's Day 1835 by the archbishop of Dublin, Dr Daniel Murray.

Exterior

The church was designed by Patrick Byrne and built between 1835 and 1844, not long after Catholic emancipation. The front has a granite portico with four Ionic columns. The three-stage Italianate belltower, with its copper dome, was completed in 1843 and is a visual focal point along the quay, except where blocked by the dome of the Four Courts to the east. The inclusion of a clock, less common on Catholic Churches, implies a sense of public responsibility thus increasing the status of the building.

St Paul's contains a peal of eight bells cast by James Sheridan, of the Eagle Foundry, Church Street. These were originally hung for change ringing for most of their existence; however, they were converted into a chime (operated by one person only) in 1950, and can no longer be rung full-circle.

A statue of St. Paul above the portico tops the apex, flanked by statues of SS. Peter and Patrick. The statues are the work of Joseph Robinson Kirk and were added about 1870. The large centre door leads to the church proper, while the smaller doors on either side give access to the balcony.

Interior
The entrance hallway, inside the main door, has a mosaic floor. a marble baptismal font is in the rear of nave. It has a shallow barrel-vaulted coffered ceiling. Steps to the altar are of marble, as is the altar itself. The mural above the altar is a copy of Rubens' Conversion of St. Paul, done by F. S. Barff around 1863, which replaced an earlier depiction of the crucifixion. The apse is lit by a skylight.

References

External links
 St. Paul's Church, Arran Quay, Dublin, Ireland
 St. Paul's Church, Arran Quay, Dublin, Ireland FB Page

Churches of the Roman Catholic Archdiocese of Dublin
Roman Catholic churches in Dublin (city)
Greek Revival architecture in Ireland